Roussos Dimitrakopoulos is a Canadian geoscientist, and a professor at McGill University. He was selected to receive the William Christian Krumbein Medal in 2018 from the International Association for Mathematical Geosciences. He was also the recipient of the Georges Matheron Lectureship Award 2015 from the International Association for Mathematical Geosciences. Since 2007 Dimitrakopoulos has been the Editor-in-Chief of Mathematical Geosciences.

Research

Selected books

References

Living people
Year of birth missing (living people)
Academic staff of McGill University
Geostatistics
University of Alberta alumni
Georges Matheron Lectureship recipients
Canadian people of Greek descent